The Museum of Contemporary Art in Kraków (MOCAK),, is a contemporary art gallery in Kraków, Poland that opened on 19 May 2011. Situated 3 kilometres from the centre of the city, on a demolished part of the factory of Oskar Schindler, the aim of the gallery is to present and support contemporary art and artists, in particular art from the last two decades.

The Museum includes a library, bookshop, café and contemporary art conservation laboratory.

The museum houses works by such artists as AES+F, Krzysztof Wodiczko, Beat Streuli, Ragnar Kjartansson, Robert Kuśmirowski, Tomasz Bajer, Krištof Kintera, Maria Stangret, and Edward Dwurnik. The permanent exhibition is located on the first floor of the building and temporary exhibitions are displayed on the second floor.

The building of the museum was designed by Claudio Nardi and it was inspired by neomodern architecture. The exhibition area is divided into several sections and covers the area of 4,000 square metres while the area of the whole museum covers 10,000 square metres. The cost of the museum is estimated at 70 million PLN (ca. €16 million) and its construction was co-financed from the European Union funds.

References

External links 

 

Art museums and galleries in Poland
Museums in Kraków
Museum of Contemporary Art in Krakow
Art museums established in 2010